O Friend, This Waiting! is a 2012 Indian, bilingual documentary film in Telugu and English written and directed by Sandhya Kumar, based on the poetry of  17th century Telugu composer Kshetrayya. For its wholly unconventional investigation of the Devadasi tradition in Andhra, combining an appreciation of this delicate and sensuous art form
with a genuine sociological exploration, the non feature film has received the National Film Award for Best Arts/Cultural Film at the 61st National Film Awards. The film has received special mention at the Erasing Borders Festival of Classical Dance, Indo-American Arts Council, New York, 2013.

Awards
National Film Awards
National Film Award for Best Arts/Cultural Film (2013)

International honor
Mumbai International Film Festival, Mumbai 2014
International Documentary and Short Film Festival of Kerala, 2013
Mudra Festival of Classical Dance, National Centre for Performing Arts (NCPA), Mumbai, 2013
Erasing Borders Festival of Classical Dance, Indo-American Arts Council, New York, 2013
Red Poppy Art House, San Francisco, 2012
National Gallery of Modern Art, Bangalore, 2012

References

2012 films
2010s Telugu-language films
2010s English-language films
Indian documentary films
Documentary films about dance
2012 documentary films